Novoprokhladnoe is a rural locality (a selo) in Dakhovskoye Rural Settlement of Maykopsky District, Russia. The population was 119 as of 2018. There are 5 streets.

Geography 
The village is located in the valley of the Sakhray River, 54 km south of Tulsky (the district's administrative centre) by road. Merkulayevka is the nearest rural locality.

References 

Rural localities in Maykopsky District